Pectis rusbyi, or Rusby's cinchweed, is a summer blooming annual plant in the genus Pectis. Its floral region is Arizona.

References

rusbyi
Flora of North America